The Tarbuck knot was made popular around 1952 by Kenneth Tarbuck, a climber and skier, for use by climbers, and was primarily used with stranded nylon ropes, before the advent of kernmantle ropes made this use both unnecessary and unsafe.
It was used when the rope is subject to heavy or sudden loads, as it will slide to a limited extent thus reducing shock (but with kernmantle ropes it can strip the outer sheath). The knot was already employed by 1946 as "the knot" by American tree trimmers.

References

See also
List of knots

Running knots